Simaethulina is a monotypic genus of Congolese jumping spiders containing the single species, Simaethulina castanea. It was first described by Wanda Wesołowska in 2012, and is found only in the Congo.

References

Monotypic Salticidae genera
Salticidae
Spiders of Africa
Taxa named by Wanda Wesołowska